Roter Hahn is one of the oldest inns in Germany founded in 1380 and located in Rothenburg ob der Tauber, Bavaria.

In 1905 it was purchased by Johann Scherer and his family runs the hotel also today.

See also 
List of oldest companies

References

External links 
Homepage
Listed as one of 17 oldest world hotels
Reviews on TripAdvisor.

Hotels in Germany
Restaurants in Germany
Companies established in the 14th century
14th-century establishments in the Holy Roman Empire